Winter-Harvest is the second album by Dutch beat band Golden Earrings, released in 1967.

Track listing
All songs written by Gerritsen and Kooymans.

Original track listing

Side 1
"Another Man in Town" - 2:22
"Smoking Cigarettes" - 2:19
"In My House" - 3:57
"Don't Wanna Lose That Girl" - 2:15
"Impeccable Girl" - 2:14
"Tears and Lies" - 2:00
"You've Got the Intention to Hurt Me" - 3:06

Side 2
"Dream" - 2:39
"You Break My Heart" - 2:00
"Baby Don't Make Me Nervous" - 2:25
"Call Me" - 2:17
"Happy and Young Together" - 3:04
"Lionel the Miser" - 2:29
"There Will Be a Tomorrow" - 2:19

CD reissue bonus tracks
"Daddy Buy Me a Girl" - 2:42
Single A-side, October 1966
"What You Gonna Tell" - 1:44
Single B-side, October 1966
"Don't Run Too Far" - 2:15
Single A-side, December 1966
"Wings" - 2:10
Single B-side, December 1966

Personnel
Frans Krassenburg - vocals
George Kooymans - guitar, vocals
Rinus Gerritsen - bass, piano
Jaap Eggermont - drums

Additional personnel
Cees Schrama - piano, organ, vibes
Fred Haayen - production

References

Golden Earring albums
1967 albums
Polydor Records albums